The Karate Dog (simply Karate Dog on home video) is a 2004 American made-for-television crime comedy film directed by Bob Clark and produced by Frank Hübner. It stars Chevy Chase (as the voice of Cho Cho), Simon Rex, Jon Voight, and Jaime Pressly. Nicollette Sheridan and Pat Morita also make appearances.

Plot

A talking dog named Cho Cho teams up with a police detective named Peter Fowler to solve the murder of his owner Chin Li.

Cast
 Chevy Chase as Cho-Cho (voice). He teams up with Peter to solve the killing of Chin Li, his old owner.
 Jon Voight as Hamilton Cage, the primary antagonist.
 Simon Rex as Det. Peter Fowler. He goes with Cho Cho to find out who killed Chin Li.
 Jaime Pressly as Ashley Wilkenson. She is a police officer who wants to be a detective, and she and Peter are attracted to each other.
 Pat Morita as Chin Li
 Thomas Kretschmann as Gerber
 Nicollette Sheridan as White Cat (voice)
 Lori Petty as COLAR (voice)
 Ron Lester as Edward Cage
 Garry Chalk as Brunelli
 Dagmar Midcap as TV Reporter

Production

Filming
The Karate Dog was filmed in Los Angeles, California (in the United States) and in Vancouver, British Columbia (in Canada).

Release
The Karate Dog originally aired on ABC Family on Monday, May 29, 2006 at 7:00 PM Eastern / 6:00 PM Central.

References

External links
 

ABC Family original films
2004 films
2004 television films
2000s English-language films
Films scored by Paul Zaza
Films directed by Bob Clark
Films about dogs
Karate films
2000s crime comedy films
2004 comedy films